Gowrishankar  (born 30 November)  is an Indian actor and producer known for his work in Kannada cinema, Through his career  started as an assistant director in  Kannada  films.

Filmography

References

External links
 

Living people
Indian male film actors
Kannada people
Male actors in Kannada cinema
Kannada film producers
Film producers from Karnataka
21st-century Indian male actors
Male actors from Karnataka
People from Shimoga district
Year of birth missing (living people)